Aethes chilesi is a species of moth of the family Tortricidae. It was named by Razowski and Wojtusiak in 2008. It is found in Carchi Province, Ecuador.

The ground colour of the forewings is white, preserved as a large costal blotch, suffused with brownish and brownish cream and strigulated (finely streaked) with pale rust brown and brown in other parts of the wing. The hindwings are brown cream, strigulated with brownish grey.

Etymology
The species name refers to Volcan Chiles, the type locality.

References

chilesi
Moths described in 2008
Taxa named by Józef Razowski
Moths of South America